Abbas Fadhel is an Iraqi-French film director, screenwriter and film critic, born in Babylon, Iraq.

Based in France since the age of 18 years, he studied cinema at the Sorbonne University until Ph.D.

In January 2002, he returned to Iraq with a French passport and filmed a documentary film, Back to Babylon (film), in which he asked himself: "What have my childhood friends become? How have their lives changed? What would my life have been like if I hadn't chosen to build my destiny elsewhere?" The country's dramatic situation is the background of this introspective investigation.

One year later, in February 2003, when a new war seems imminent, Abbas Fadhel returned to Iraq with the intention of filming his family and friends, and the superstitious hope of protecting them against the dangers threatening them. When the war started, he returned to France and lost all contact with his family. Two months later, he again returned to Iraq and discovered a country shaken by violence, the nightmare of dictatorship replaced by chaos, but a country where, nonetheless, everything remains possible: the best or the worse. This historical moment is the theme of his second documentary film, We Iraqis.

In 2008, he directed the feature film Dawn of the World, a war-drama in which he gives an unexpected account of the multiple impacts of the Gulf Wars and how they have dramatically damaged an area known to be the geographic location of the biblical Garden of Eden.

In 2015, his new film  Homeland (Iraq Year Zero), a monumental documentary of 334 minutes, is awarded at Visions du réel - Nyon International Film Festival.

Filmography

2002: Back to Babylon
2004: We Iraqis
2008: Dawn of the World
2015: Homeland (Iraq Year Zero)
2018: Yara
2022: Tales of the Purple House

Short films 
Things in the shadow
Weegee's World
Sunday at a suburban café

Awards
 Sesterce d'Or (Best Feature Film Award - International Competition), Festival Visions du réel, 2015, for  Homeland (Iraq Year Zero).
 Doc Alliance Selection Award,  Locarno International Film Festival, 2015, for Homeland (Iraq Year Zero).
 White Goose Award (Best Feature Film Award - International Competition), DMZ International Documentary Film Festival, 2015, for Homeland (Iraq Year Zero).
 Award of Excellence (International Competition), and Citizens' Prize) at  Yamagata International Documentary Film Festival, 2015, for Homeland (Iraq Year Zero).
 Best Film award, Gulf Film Festival, 2009, for Dawn of the World.
 Audience Award and NETPAC Award, Vesoul International Film Festival of Asian Cinema, 2009, for Dawn of the World.
 Best Film award, 20th Fameck Arab Film Festival, 2009, for Dawn of the World.
 Great Prize of the Jury, Rabat International Film Festival, 2009, for Dawn of the World.
Great Prize for the best scriptwriter (Grand Prix du Meilleur Scénariste, SOPADIN), for Dawn of the World.
 Best Screenplay Award (Trophée du Premier Scénario, Centre National de la Cinématographie), for Dawn of the World.
 Best Screenplay Award, 9th Beirut International Film Festival, 2009, for Dawn of the World.
 Prize of the Jury, 15th African, Asian and Latin American Film Festival, Milano, Italy, 2005, for We Iraqis.
 The Shield of the Ministry of Culture, Iraq, 2010.
 Honorary Diploma of the Ministry of Culture, Iraq, 2010.

See also

Cinema of Iraq
Iraqi culture

References

External links

 
 Abbas Fahdel's Official Website
 Interview with Abbas Fahdel

University of Paris alumni
Iraqi film directors
Iraqi documentary filmmakers
Iraqi emigrants to France
Iraqi screenwriters
Iraqi documentary film directors
French documentary film directors
French people of Iraqi descent
People from Hillah
Writers from Baghdad
French male screenwriters
French screenwriters
French film critics
Living people
French artists
21st-century Iraqi writers
21st-century French non-fiction writers
Year of birth missing (living people)
21st-century French screenwriters